The Matuntara are an Indigenous Australian people of the Northern Territory.

Language
Though called "Southern Luritja", the Matuntara seems to have been Antakarinya.

Country
Their nomadic lives were spent south of the Levi Range around the Palmer River tributary of the Finke River. Their eastern extension ran over to Erldunda, while their westerly boundary lay at Curtin Springs. Their lands extended across what is now the border, into South Australia.

Their neighbours to the south were the Antakirinja. Their neighbours to the northwest were the Gugadja, with whom they are sometimes confused, being considered by some early explorers to have been a southern horde of the latter.

History
The Matuntara at one point in time, around the turn of the 19-20 century, absorbed a branch of the Pitjantjatjara known as the Maiulataraclan, when the latter migrated eastwards to Tempe Downs from their grounds that lay to the north of the Petermann Range.

Alternative names
 Matutara
 Matjutu
 Maduntara(pejorative Pitjantjatjara exonym).
 Madutara, Maiulatara (Antakirinja and Yankuntjatjarra)
 Maiuladjara
 Southern Loritja
 Aluna (Pitjantjatjara name for those who spoke the Matuntara language)
 Ku'dadji (Again a Pitjantjatjara term distinguishing them from the Mangawara)

Notes

Citations

Sources

Aboriginal peoples of the Northern Territory